Fernando Santos may refer to:

Sports
Fernando Santos (footballer, born 1954), Portuguese football manager and former player
Fernando Santos (footballer, born 1980), Brazilian former footballer

Politicians
Fernando da Piedade Dias dos Santos (born 1950), Vice President of Angola
Fernando Teixeira dos Santos (born 1951), Portuguese Minister of Finance

Other(s)
Fernando Santos Costa (1899–1982), Portuguese army officer

See also
Luís Fernando (footballer, born 1983), Luís Fernando Rodrigues dos Santos, (born 1983), Brazilian footballer
Fernando Castro Santos (born 1952), Spanish football manager